Jérôme Marcel Crews (born 20 February 1977 in Karlsruhe) is a retired German athlete who specialised in the 110 metres hurdles. He represented his country at the 2004 Summer Olympics, as well as two World Championships, in 2001 and 2003.

He has personal bests of 13.41 seconds in the 110 metres hurdles (+0.1 m/s; Sindelfingen 1998) and 7.65 seconds in the 60 metres hurdles (Karlsruhe 1999).

Competition record

References

1977 births
Living people
German male hurdlers
Athletes (track and field) at the 2004 Summer Olympics
Olympic athletes of Germany
Sportspeople from Karlsruhe